Wallace Coe is a former New Zealand boxer.

He won the gold medal in the men's 64 – 69 kg (welterweight) division at the 1962 British Empire and Commonwealth Games.

References

Living people
Year of birth missing (living people)
Welterweight boxers
Boxers at the 1962 British Empire and Commonwealth Games
Commonwealth Games gold medallists for New Zealand
New Zealand male boxers
Commonwealth Games medallists in boxing
Medallists at the 1962 British Empire and Commonwealth Games